2nd CC.NN. Division "Fiamme Nere" ("Black Flames"), was one of the three Blackshirts Divisions sent to Spain during the Spanish Civil War to make up the "Corpo Truppe Volontarie" (Corps of Volunteer Troops), or CTV. Was strengthened after the end of the War in the North for the Aragon Offensive in 1938 with Division XXIII di Marzo and renamed XXIII Marzo Division "Fiamme Nere".

Order of battle for the Battle of Guadalajara 

2nd CC.NN. Division "Fiamme Nere" - Bgd. Gen. Guido Amerigo Coppi 
 6th Group of Banderas - Console Mario Pittau.
 651 Bandera "Ardita" - Seniore Spagnolo
 630 Bandera "Intrepida" - 1st Seniore Angelucci
 638 Bandera "Audace" - Seniore Alberto Zaccherini
 Support Battery 65/17
 Engineers Section
 7th Group of Banderas - Console Marino Marino
 724 Bandera "Inflessibile" - Seniore Gamberini
 735 Bandera "Implacabile" - Seniore Bruno Calzolari
 740 Bandera "Disperata" - Seniore Domenico Paladino
 Support Battery 65/17 
 Engineers Section
 8th Grupo de Banderas - Console Fausto Vandelli
 530 Bandera "Inesorabile" - Seniore Fausto Vandelli
 730 Bandera - 1st Seniore Calzonsori
 ? Bandera - Seniore Palezzi
 Support Battery 65/17
 Engineers Section
 "Carabinieri" Section
 Intendencia Section
 Sanitation Section
 Division Truck Unit
 Division Artillery - Teniente Coronel Pettinare
 Antiaircraft Battery 20mm 
 XI Group 75/27 (3 batteries of 4 guns) 
 VIII Group 100/17 (2 batteries of 4 guns) 
 IX Group 100/17 (2 batteries of 4 guns) 
 II Group 149/12 (2 batteries of 3 guns)  
 Combat Engineers Platoon
 Artillery Park Section

The Blackshirt (Camicie Nere, or CC.NN.) Divisions contained regular soldiers and volunteer militia from the National Fascist Party. The CC.NN. divisions were semi-motorised.

Sources 
de Mesa, José Luis, El regreso de las legiones: (la ayuda militar italiana à la España nacional, 1936-1939),  García Hispán, Granada:España, 1994 

Divisions of Italy in the Spanish Civil War
Blackshirt divisions of Italy